Alfred Ridley-Martin (9 May 1881 – 6 May 1970) was a British fencer. He competed at the 1912 and 1920 Summer Olympics. He was twice British fencing champion, winning the sabre title at the British Fencing Championships in 1910 and 1913.

References

1881 births
1970 deaths
British male fencers
Olympic fencers of Great Britain
Fencers at the 1912 Summer Olympics
Fencers at the 1920 Summer Olympics
People from Lewisham